Independence Building may refer to:

 Independence Hotel, Sihanoukville, Cambodia
 Independence House, Lagos, Nigeria; an office tower
 Independence Tower, Ankara, Turkey; at the mausoleum tomb of Mustafa Kemal Atatürk
 Independence State Hospital, Independence, Iowa, USA; an insane asylum
 Independence Building (Charlotte), Mecklenburg County, North Carolina, USA; an office building demolished in 1981
 Independence Hall (disambiguation)
 Independence Mall (disambiguation)
 Independence Centre (disambiguation)
 Palace of Independence (disambiguation)
 Independence Plaza (disambiguation)

See also
 Independence (disambiguation)
 Building (disambiguation)